Danny Ray Pittman (born April 3, 1958) is a former American football wide receiver who played five seasons in the National Football League with the New York Giants and St. Louis Cardinals. He was drafted by the New York Giants in the fourth round of the 1980 NFL Draft. He first enrolled at Pasadena City College before transferring to the University of Wyoming and attended John Muir High School in Pasadena, California.

References

External links
Just Sports Stats
College stats

Living people
1958 births
Players of American football from Louisiana
American football wide receivers
African-American players of American football
Wyoming Cowboys football players
New York Giants players
St. Louis Cardinals (football) players
Players of American football from Memphis, Tennessee
21st-century African-American people
20th-century African-American sportspeople